Gamma Island also known as Bjornesk Island is a large uninhabited island of the Greenland Sea, Greenland. The island has an area of 236 km2 and an elevation of 293 meters. It lies south of Jokel Bay and southwest of the Danske Islands and is separated from the mainland by the Orleans Sound, on the other side of which lies Nordmarken.

History
Gamma Island was named by the Mørkefjord expedition 1938–39 after the name of ship "Gamma" used by the expedition.

See also
List of islands of Greenland
Mylonite
Cataclasite

References

Uninhabited islands of Greenland